The 2022–23 Santosh Trophy group stage was contested by a total of 36 teams from 23 December 2022 to 31 January 2023, to decide the remaining 9 places in the Final round of the tournament.

Schedule

Centralised venues
On 25 November 2022, the AIFF announced the venues for Groups I, II and V. The venue for Group III and IV was confirmed on 28 and 29 November respectively. The final group venue was confirmed on 7 December.
 Group I → New Delhi, Delhi (Jawaharlal Nehru Stadium, Ambedkar Stadium)
 Group II → Kozhikode, Kerala (EMS Stadium)
 Group III → Kokrajhar, Assam (SAI Special Area Games Centre, KDSA Playground)
 Group IV → Kohlapur, Maharashtra (Chhatrapati Shahu Stadium)
 Group V → Bhubaneswar, Odisha (Capital Football Arena, OSAP 7th Battalion Ground)
 Group VI → Imphal, Manipur (Khuman Lampak Main Stadium, Eastern Sporting Union Ground)

Group I

Group II

Group III

Group IV

Group V

Group VI

Ranking of second-placed teams

Statistics

Top scorers

Clean sheets

Hat-tricks

References

 2022–23 Santosh Trophy